This is a list of open clusters located in the Milky Way. An open cluster is a gravitationally bound association of up to a few thousand stars that all formed from the same giant molecular cloud. There are over 1,000 known open clusters in the Milky Way galaxy, but the actual total may be up to ten times higher. The estimated half-lives of clusters, after which half the original cluster members will have been lost, range from 150 million to 800 million years, depending on the original density.

See also
 Lists of astronomical objects
 List of globular clusters
 Lists of clusters

References
 

open clusters
 
Open